Awad Zakka is a Libyan volleyball player. He competed in the men's tournament at the 1980 Summer Olympics.

References

Year of birth missing (living people)
Living people
Libyan men's volleyball players
Olympic volleyball players of Libya
Volleyball players at the 1980 Summer Olympics
Place of birth missing (living people)